Inácio José Trocado Marques (born 2 November 1995) is a Portuguese professional footballer who plays for CF Canelas 2010 as a left-back.

Football career
He made his Taça da Liga debut for Cova da Piedade on 28 July 2019 in a game against Leixões.

References

External links

Zezinho at ZeroZero

1995 births
Living people
People from Póvoa de Varzim
Portuguese footballers
Association football defenders
Campeonato de Portugal (league) players
Sport Benfica e Castelo Branco players
C.D. Cova da Piedade players
Sportspeople from Porto District